John Christian Ruckelshaus III is an American politician.

Biography
Ruckelshaus is a Republican politician who was a member of the Indiana Senate representing the 30th district where he served from 2016 to 2020. He previously served in the Indiana House of Representatives from 1990 to 1992 from the 49th district. He ran when incumbent State Representative Bill Spencer retired. Ruckelshaus ran for the State Senate in 1992, but lost the Republican primary. He was succeeded by Phillip T. Warner in the 49th district. Ruckelshaus previously served as the Deputy Commissioner of the Indiana Department of Workforce Development for Government Affairs from 2006 to 2008. He replaced Deputy Commissioner Anne Valentine after she retired. He was replaced by Michelle Marshel. Ruckelshaus previously served as a Member of the Washington Township Marion County Advisory Board from 1986 to 1990. Ruckelshaus is the nephew of William Ruckelshaus, the former Deputy Attorney General under President Richard Nixon and the former EPA Administrator under Nixon and President Ronald Reagan. His father John C. Ruckelshaus also served in the Indiana Senate.

References

External links
John Ruckelshaus at Ballotpedia
Project Vote Smart – Senator John Ruckelshaus (IN) profile
Our Campaigns – Senator John Ruckelshaus (IN) profile
State Senate Website

Living people
Politicians from Indianapolis
Indiana University alumni
Republican Party members of the Indiana House of Representatives
Republican Party Indiana state senators
21st-century American politicians
Year of birth missing (living people)